The 87th 2013 Lunar New Year Cup, also known as the China Mobile Satellite Communication Cup due to sponsorship reason, is the annual football event held in Hong Kong in Lunar New Year. The name of this event was changed back to Lunar New Year Cup after two editions of Asian Challenge Cup were held in 2011 and 2012.

Teams

Public Vote of Hong Kong League XI Team
Each First Division League team had nominated at most 4 defenders, 3  midfielders and 3 forwards for the public vote of Hong Kong League XI Team. 10 players with the highest number of vote from different position were selected to the team, while 2 goalkeepers and 6 other players were chosen by the head coach of the team, Josep Gombau.

10 players with the highest voting in each position of the public vote are as follows:

Squads

Hong Kong League XI

 Honorary Team Manager:  Brian Leung
 Deputy Honorary Team Manager:  Steven Lo,  Pui Kwan Kay,  Ken Ng
 Coach:  Josep Gombau (Kitchee)
 CSCoach selection, PSPublic selection
 *Deng Jinghuang(Sun Pegaus) resigned due to injury.

Shanghai East Asia
General coach:  Xu Genbao
Head coach:  Jiang Bingyao

Muangthong United
Manager:  Slaviša Jokanović

Busan IPark
Manager:  Yoon Sung-Hyo

Fixtures and results

Semi-finals

Third place match

Final

References

Lunar New Year Cup
Lunar